TATA LPT 613 is a truck produced by the Indian manufacturer Tata Motors. This truck is part of the TATA LPT family of trucks, based on second-generation Mercedes-Benz LN. In Ukraine, this model is manufactured in the city of Chornomorsk in the Odessa Oblast at the CJSC "ZAZ" and in the "Boryspil Bus Plant" in Prolisky, Kyiv Oblast. The trucks manufactured by the latter are sold under the brand name BAZ-T713 Podorozhnik. From the 2004 model year, the model is made in Russia by the company "Automobiles and engines of the Urals" under the name AMUR-4346.

Engine 
One of the strongest Tata LPT 613 Trunks is a reliable, time-tested engine Tata 697 NA, issued under the license of the Mercedes-Benz OM 352. 6-cylinder, in-line, volume oh 5.755 liters and Power at 130 hp (at 2400 rpm), it works in pairs with 5-speed mechanics Tata GBS-40. PPC - with synchronizers on all front-end gear and slippery gear for reverse gear. Torque - 416-430 Nm - is already reached at 1400-1700 rpm. Friction - friction, single disc, dry, with diaphragm spring. Engine Cooling - Liquid. Rechargeable battery - 120 A / h, 12 W.

References 

LPT-613